Harrington Reynolds was an English actor who appeared on stage and in a number of movies.  He was best known for Old English (1930), Ride 'em, Cowgirl (1939) and Two Sinners (1935).

He started his own drama company.

References

External links

1886 births
1961 deaths
English male television actors
British male actors
British expatriate male actors in the United States
British expatriates in Mexico